Smart Communications Inc., commonly referred to as Smart (and officially stylized/ self-styled as SMART), is a wholly owned wireless communications and digital services subsidiary of PLDT Inc., a telecommunications and digital services provider based in the Philippines. The company has 73 million mobile subscribers as of 2020, under the brands Smart, Sun, and TNT. Smart's wireless broadband subscribers number 3.8 million under the brands Smart Bro and Sun Wireless Broadband.

Smart offers commercial wireless services through its 2G, 3G, 3.5G HSPA+, 4G LTE, and LTE-A networks, with 5G currently being deployed in multiple locations in the Philippines. Smart's terrestrial wireless telephony service is being complemented by its satellite communication services Smart Sat and Marino which also serve the global maritime industry.

The company has introduced wireless offerings such as Smart Money, a mobile electronic wallet that also enables its SMS-based money remittance service Smart Padala (now integrated with PayMaya). It has also been recognized for introducing the world's first over-the-air electronic prepaid loading service called Smart Load. One of its services, PasaLoad, allows its users to pass phone credits to other Smart prepaid accounts through SMS.

History
Anticipating the liberalization of the telecommunications industry in the Philippines a group of Filipino investors led by Orlando B. Vea and David T. Fernando organized Smart (then named Smart Information Technology, Inc.) on January 24, 1991. The company obtained its congressional franchise in April 1992 and was granted a provisional authority to operate a mobile cellular service in May 1993. In December 1993, Smart commenced commercial operations of its cellular service. By then, Smart had drawn in partners. These were: First Pacific, a Hong Kong-based conglomerate through its Philippine flagship Metro Pacific Investments Corporation and Nippon Telegraph and Telephone of Japan (NTT).

In compliance with the government's telecommunications program, Smart established a local exchange service in the cities and provinces assigned to it under the "service area scheme." The company also obtained licenses to provide international gateway, paging and inter-carrier transmission services.

On March 24, 2000, PLDT completed its share-swap acquisition of Smart, making Smart a 100%-owned PLDT subsidiary.

In February 2011, Smart unveiled the Netphone, its own line of Android-compliant smartphones designed for emerging markets at the GSMA Mobile World Congress in Barcelona, Spain. The Netphone was introduced as the world's first smartphone backed by an operator-managed platform.

On August 25, 2012, Smart launched the Philippines' first 4G mobile broadband commercial service running on LTE technology. On April 13, 2016, Smart introduced the first commercial LTE-A Service in Boracay, Aklan.

On June 13, 2016, Smart and its parent company PLDT unveiled their new logos and identity as part of the company's continuing digital pivot.

In February 2017, Smart and parent company PLDT signed a memorandum of understanding with China-based Huawei Technologies "to shape the strategic and commercial development of the 5G ecosystem in the Philippines".

On April 21, 2017, Philippine President Rodrigo Duterte signed Republic Act No. 10926 which renewed Smart's license for another 25 years. The law granted Smart a franchise to establish, maintain, lease and operate integrated telecommunications, computers, electronics, and stations throughout the Philippines. 

In October 2018, petitioners asked the Supreme Court to stop Globe and Smart from using the 700 MHz and Smart announced that they were working to fix its slow internet service. On July 30, 2020, Smart activated their 5G mobile network initially in Makati Central Business District, Bonifacio Global City CBD, Araneta City, SM Megamall and Mall of Asia Bay Area.

Radio frequency summary

Esports 
Smart and its parent company PLDT launched Omega esports, a professional esports team for Dota 2, Mobile Legends: Bang Bang, and Tekken 7 that competed in the 2019 The Nationals. It is also a major sponsor of Mobile Legends: Bang Bang esports events in the Philippines such as the previous MSC 2019.

Sports teams
TNT Tropang Giga (PBA basketball team)
Smart Giga Hitters (PSL women's volleyball team)

Sponsorships
 FIBA (International Basketball Federation), since 2020
KCON:TACT, since 2020
Mnet Asian Music Awards, since 2020
M Countdown, since 2021

See also
TNT (Smart's low-end cellular service)
Sun Cellular (cellular service absorbed by Smart and is now defunct as of 2022)
Smart Gilas (Philippine men's national basketball team)

References

External links
Official Homepage

 
PLDT subsidiaries
Members of the Conexus Mobile Alliance
Philippine brands
Mobile phone companies of the Philippines
Telecommunications companies established in 1991
Companies based in Makati
Philippine companies established in 1991
Internet service providers of the Philippines